The U.S. Import and Export Price Indexes measure average changes in prices of goods and services that are imported to or exported from the U.S..  The indexes are produced monthly by the International Price Program (IPP) of the Bureau of Labor Statistics.  The Import and Export Price Indexes were published quarterly starting in 1974 and monthly since 1989.

History of the International Price Program 

The origins of the International Price Program (IPP) can be traced to a 1961 report on Federal Price Statistics prepared by the National Bureau of Economic Research. The report for Congress' Joint Economic Committee suggested that indexes be assigned to a federal statistical agency "to obtain the attention and resources for these indexes that we believe are essential." A further study undertaken for NBER by Professors Irving Kravis and Robert Lipsey gave more impetus to the project. In their study, "Price Competitiveness in World Trade," Kravis and Lipsey outlined the need for such measures and the feasibility of producing them.  During this time, the Bureau's Division of Price and Index Number Research began research on the feasibility of producing import and export price indexes.  The IPP was a result of this research and was established as an ongoing program in 1971.

The IPP produced its first annual international price indexes in 1973.  Largely as a response to changing international economic conditions and the need on the part of both the Federal Government and the private sector to obtain these data on a more timely basis, collection and publication of international price indexes were begun on a quarterly basis in 1974. The IPP increased the commodity area coverage and detail of its indexes as more samples were initiated.

In 1982 full coverage in the import and export goods categories was available and the Office of Management and Budget placed the IPP indexes on its list of Principal Federal Economic Indicators together with the Consumer Price Index and Producer Price Index.  The IPP continued to expand by introducing selected services indexes.  Various transportation services indexes were added to the IPP in the late 1980s.  Research is continuing on other international services as data and resources become available.  Beginning in 1989, BLS began producing a limited number of indexes on a monthly basis. With the release of March 1992 data, IPP added import locality of origin indexes, and in January 1993 began monthly publication of the major merchandise indexes.  In 2005, the IPP expanded its output of import price indexes based on locality of origin to include France, Germany, the United Kingdom, the Pacific Rim, the Association of South East Asian Nations (ASEAN), and the Asia Near East.

Scope of the Export and Import Price Indexes 

The target universe of the import and export price indexes consist of all goods and services sold by U.S. residents to foreign buyers (exports) and purchased from abroad by U.S. residents (imports). Items for which it is difficult to obtain consistent with time series core comparable products, however, such as works of art, are excluded.  Products that may be purchased on the open market for military use are included, but goods exclusively for military use are excluded.  Only selected services for transportation areas are included.

Data sources 

Most of the relevant price data is collected by a fielded survey directed at U.S. importers and exporters. Respondent participation is voluntary, and cooperation of survey respondents in providing data is necessary for the Bureau to perform its responsibilities as mandated by Congress.  The data collected by the Bureau of Labor Statistics is strictly confidential. The Confidential Information Protection and Statistical Efficiency Act of 2002 (Title 5 of Public Law 107-347) protects the confidentiality of the data provided by the respondents.  Price data that is not received directly from survey respondents, referred to as secondary source data, is also used in the calculation of some indexes, including petroleum, ocean tanker freight, and grains indexes.

The import merchandise sampling frames are obtained from the U.S. Customs Service. The export merchandise sampling frames are obtained from the Canadian Customs Service for exports to Canada and from the Bureau of the Census for exports to the rest of the world.  Data sources for services are researched and developed separately for each category.  For example, the Department of Transportation provides the sampling frames for the air freight price indexes.  The reference period for a sampling frame is generally the most recent available 12 months.

Calculation weights are derived from the dollar values found on the sampling frames and from trade dollar values compiled by the Bureau of the Census for the base year.

Calculating index changes 

Movements of price indexes from one month to another usually should be expressed as percent changes, rather than as changes in index points, because the latter are affected by the level of the index in relation to its base period, while the former are not. Each index measures price changes from a reference period defined to equal 100.0. 

An increase of 20 percent from the base period in the Export Price Index, for example, is shown as 120.0, which can be expressed in dollars as follows: “Prices received by domestic producers of a systematic sample of finished goods have risen from $100 in the base period, December 2001, to $120 today.” Likewise, a current index of 133.3 would indicate that prices received by producers of export goods today are one-third higher than what they were in December 2001.

See also 
 Bureau of Labor Statistics
 Consumer Price Index
 Producer Price Index 
 Inflation
 FRED (Federal Reserve Economic Data)

References

External links 
 The IPP homepage
 Get IPP statistics

Price indices
Foreign trade of the United States
Bureau of Labor Statistics